Battle City may refer to:

 Battle City (video game), a 1985 multi-directional shooter arcade and video game by Namco
 Battle City (Yu-Gi-Oh!), a story arc in Yu-Gi-Oh!